Riverfront Broadcasting LLC is a privately held company in Yankton, South Dakota, United States.

Stations

On March 1, 2008, six radio stations were added to the broadcasting stable of Riverfront Broadcasting: KYNT (AM), Yankton, South Dakota; KK93 (FM), Yankton, South Dakota; KQRN (FM), Mitchell, South Dakota; KORN (AM), Mitchell, South Dakota; KLXS (FM), Pierre, South Dakota, KCCR (AM), Pierre, South Dakota, and KCCR-FM in Blunt, South Dakota.

Radio stations KNCY (AM) and KNCY-FM broadcasting country music from Nebraska City, Nebraska were already part of the Riverfront holdings.

On July 1, 2010, Riverfront Broadcasting LLC put KDAM FM on the air.  KDAM is playing mainstream rock from the 80's to today.
On December 31, 2013, Riverfront broadcasting Sold KNCY and KNCY-FM to Flood Communications

In late 2016, Riverfront Broadcasting LLC sold their Mitchell-market stations KORN, KQRN, and KORN-FM to Mitchell-market General Manager, Nancy Nedved, and her husband Steve Nedved. Effective Sunday, January 1, 2017, the three Mitchell-market stations are now known as Nedved Media, LLC. The three Mitchell stations sold for $3.35 million USD, and the sale was consummated on April 1, 2017.

References

External links 
  Riverfront Broadcasting

 
Mass media in South Dakota
Radio broadcasting companies of the United States